Cyperus pilosus is a species of sedge that is native to parts of Asia and Australia.

The species was first formally described by the botanist Martin Vahl in 1805.

See also 
 List of Cyperus species

References 

pilosus
Taxa named by Martin Vahl
Plants described in 1805
Flora of Queensland
Flora of New South Wales
Flora of Myanmar
Flora of Malaysia
Flora of India
Flora of Bangladesh
Flora of Borneo
Flora of Cambodia
Flora of China
Flora of Japan
Flora of Indonesia
Flora of New Guinea
Flora of the Philippines
Flora of Sri Lanka
Flora of Thailand
Flora of Taiwan
Flora of Tibet
Flora of Vietnam